Aleksandra Anna Socha Shelton (born March 30, 1982) is a Polish-American sabre fencer, bronze medal in the 2003 World Fencing Championships, European champion in 2004, and European team in 2008. She represented Poland at the time.

Career

Socha was the Polish champion in sabre for the years 1999, 2002, 2003, 2008, 2010, and 2015. As a member of the Polish Sabre Fencing Team she won medals at the European Championships in 2001 (bronze), 2006 (silver), and 2008 (gold). In Individual Sabre she won a gold medal at the 2004 European Fencing Championships and silver at the 2011 European Fencing Championships, as well as gold medals, team and individual, in the 2010 Military Fencing Championship in Caracas, Venezuela, and the 2011 Military World Games in Rio de Janeiro.

She was a member of the Polish Olympic Team for the 2004 Summer Olympics in Athens, the 2008 Summer Olympics in Beijing, and the 2012 Summer Olympics in London.

Aleksandra Socha (Ola) was going to represent Poland in Women's sabre and Women's team sabre at the 2016 Summer Olympics in Rio de Janeiro.

Personal life

Socha graduated from Middle School Nr 2 in Pabianice at age 15 and moved to Warsaw to attend Sport Championship High School and Józef Piłsudski University of Physical Education (Polish: Akademia Wychowania Fizycznego Józefa Piłsudskiego w Warszawie) where she obtained a master's degree in physical education. She is married to Bradley Shelton of Sheridan, Arkansas. She is a certified fencing coach, a fitness trainer, as well as a soldier in the 3rd Command Support Battalion of the Polish Land Forces stationed in Warsaw.

References

External links
  
 
  (archive)
  
 
 

1982 births
Living people
Polish female fencers
Fencers at the 2004 Summer Olympics
Fencers at the 2008 Summer Olympics
Fencers at the 2012 Summer Olympics
Fencers at the 2016 Summer Olympics
Olympic fencers of Poland
People from Pabianice
Sportspeople from Łódź Voivodeship